Andrei Olhovskiy was the defending champion but lost in the first round to Thierry Champion.

Ján Krošlák won in the final 6–2, 7–6(7–2) against Alexander Volkov.

Seeds
A champion seed is indicated in bold text while text in italics indicates the round in which that seed was eliminated.

  Ctislav Doseděl (first round)
  Andrei Olhovskiy (first round)
  Filip Dewulf (second round)
  Jeff Tarango (quarterfinals)
  Michael Joyce (first round)
  Sargis Sargsian (first round)
  Ján Krošlák (champion)
  Alexander Volkov (final)

Draw

External links
 1997 Shanghai Open draw

Kingfisher Airlines Tennis Open
1997 ATP Tour